Herochroma rosulata is a species of moth of the family Geometridae first described by Hongxiang Han and Dayong Xue in 2003. It is found in Hainan, China.

The length of the forewings is 24–25 mm.

References

External links
 A study on the genus Herochroma Swinhoe in China, with descriptions of four new species (Lepidoptera: Geometridae: Geometrinae). Acta Entomologica Sinica

Moths described in 2003
Pseudoterpnini
Moths of Asia